Tjapko Antoon van Bergen (March 26, 1903 in Heiligerlee, Groningen – February 2, 1944 in Krakolye, Leningrad, Russia) was a Dutch rower. He competed at the 1928 Summer Olympics in the men's coxed pair with Cornelis Dusseldorp; their boat capsized in the first round and they did not finish.

Van Bergen became a member of the National Socialist Movement in the Netherlands (NSB), the fascist and later Nazi organization that collaborated with the German occupier during World War II. He joined the SS and attained the rank of Rottenführer; he died near Narva, in Estonia, on the Eastern Front.

References

1903 births
1944 deaths
Dutch male rowers
Olympic rowers of the Netherlands
Rowers at the 1928 Summer Olympics
Dutch collaborators with Nazi Germany
Dutch fascists
Dutch Waffen-SS personnel
People from Oldambt (municipality)
Waffen-SS personnel killed in action
SS non-commissioned officers
Sportspeople from Groningen (province)
20th-century Dutch people